Lizhong Zheng is an electrical engineer from the Massachusetts Institute of Technology in Cambridge, Massachusetts. He was named a Fellow of the Institute of Electrical and Electronics Engineers (IEEE) in 2016 for his contributions to the theory of multiple antenna communication.

References

Fellow Members of the IEEE
Living people
MIT School of Engineering faculty
21st-century American engineers
Year of birth missing (living people)